Sbornik Sotsial-Demokrata (Social-Democratic Review) was a Russian publication. It was published under Lenin's direct supervision by the editorial board of Sotsial-Demokrat, the central organ of the Russian Social Democratic Labour Party (Bolsheviks). However, only two issues appeared, one in October 1916 and another in December the same year. The first issue contained an article by Karl Radek on the national question, and a reply from Lenin. The third issue was never published due to lack of funds.

References

Defunct magazines published in Russia
Defunct political magazines
Magazines established in 1916
Magazines disestablished in 1916
Russian-language magazines
Political magazines published in Russia
Socialist magazines